Michael Edward Brett Saunders (born November 19, 1986) is a Canadian former professional baseball outfielder. He played in Major League Baseball (MLB) for the Seattle Mariners, Toronto Blue Jays, and Philadelphia Phillies.

He was nicknamed "The Condor" by Dave Sims, who attributed the origin of it to Lee Tinsley. And also, "Captain Canada".

Amateur career
Saunders started his baseball playing Little League Baseball in the Gordon Head Baseball Association, and was a member of Team Canada at the 1999 Little League World Series. While attending Lambrick Park Secondary School in Victoria, British Columbia, Saunders played high school baseball for the Victoria Mariners of the British Columbia Premier Baseball League. He then played for the Tallahassee Community College Eagles prior to being drafted.

Professional career

Seattle Mariners

The Seattle Mariners selected Saunders in the 11th round of the 2004 MLB draft. He then spent the  season with the Everett AquaSox of the Short Season-A Northwest League, hitting .270 with seven home runs and 39 runs batted in (RBI). In , he was promoted to the Wisconsin Timber Rattlers of the Class-A Midwest League, hitting .239 with four home runs and 39 RBI. Despite struggling in 2006, for  he was promoted to the High Desert Mavericks of the Advanced-A California League, where he excelled, hitting .299 with 14 home runs and 77 RBI, before he was called up to the West Tenn Diamond Jaxx of the Double-A Southern League, where he finished off the season hitting .288 with one home run and seven RBI in 15 games. Saunders started the  season once again in West Tenn, where he hit .290 with eight home runs and 30 RBI in 67 games before being promoted to the Tacoma Rainiers of the Triple-A Pacific Coast League on June 17.

After beginning the  season with the Rainiers where he hit .313 with 13 home runs and 32 RBI in 243 at-bats, Saunders was promoted from Tacoma on July 25, 2009, when the Mariners designated Wladimir Balentien for assignment.  He made his MLB debut that day in a game against the Cleveland Indians at Safeco Field, where he went hitless against Jeremy Sowers in the Mariners 10–3 loss.  His first MLB hit was a single off of Cliff Lee on July 26, 2009.

On May 6, Saunders was recalled from Tacoma after the Mariners put Milton Bradley on the restricted list. Three days later, he hit his first MLB home run off Angels pitcher Ervin Santana. He finished the 2010 season with a .211 batting average, 10 home runs, and 33 RBI. Saunders played only 58 games for the Mariners in 2011, and batted .149 with just two home runs and eight RBI.

In 2012, Saunders played a career-high 139 games and greatly improved upon his 2011 campaign. He hit .247 with 19 home runs and 57 RBI. He played in 132 games the following season. Saunders finished 2013 with a .236 batting average, 12 home runs, and 46 RBI. In 2014, Saunders battled a number of injuries that limited him to 78 games, but finished with a career-high .273 average with 8 home runs and 34 RBI.

Toronto Blue Jays
At the end of the 2014 season, Jack Zduriencik, the general manager of the Mariners, publicly criticized Saunders' work ethic, which Saunders challenged. On December 3, 2014, the Mariners traded Saunders to the Toronto Blue Jays in exchange for pitcher J. A. Happ. Saunders agreed to a one-year, $2.875 million contract on January 16, 2015, to avoid salary arbitration.

On February 25, Saunders stepped on a sprinkler head while shagging fly balls and tore his meniscus. Initially, the expectation was for Saunders to be on the disabled list until the All-Star break.  However, after having surgery to remove 60% of his meniscus, the estimate was reduced to 4–6 weeks. He was assigned to the Advanced-A Dunedin Blue Jays for a rehab assignment on April 8. After the Blue Jays lost 12–3 to the Tampa Bay Rays on April 24, Saunders was activated off the disabled list. He experienced discomfort in his knee in early May, missing several games after having fluid drained and receiving a cortisone injection. Saunders returned to the line-up on May 9, but was placed on the 15-day disabled list the following day to rest his knee. After remaining on the disabled list into August, Saunders was officially shut down for the remainder of the 2015 season on August 18. He appeared in just nine games for the Blue Jays, batting .194 with three RBI.

On January 15, 2016, Saunders and the Blue Jays avoided salary arbitration by agreeing to a one-year, $2.9 million contract. In a 13–3 win over the Baltimore Orioles on June 17, Saunders hit three home runs for the first time in his career, and joined Joey Votto, Justin Morneau, and Larry Walker as the only Canadian players to hit three in a game and becoming the first to do it for a Canadian team. He also had eight RBI in the game, which established another career-high. Saunders was named as one of five candidates for the All-Star Game Final Vote campaign on July 5. He was announced as the Final Vote winner on July 8. After the All-Star break, Saunders struggled to a .178 batting average, eight home runs, and 15 RBI. Despite the poor second half of his season, Saunders still established several career-highs in 2016. He ended the campaign with a .253 batting average, 24 home runs, and 57 RBI in 140 games played. He appeared in eight postseason games for the Blue Jays, and hit .381 with one home run and RBI.

Philadelphia Phillies
On January 16, 2017, Saunders agreed to a one-year, $8 million contract with the Philadelphia Phillies that also includes a $9 million club option for the 2018 season. The contract became official on January 19. He struggled to a .205 average with six home runs for the last place Phillies during the first three months of the season. On June 20, Saunders was designated for assignment by the Phillies. He was released three days later.

Return to Toronto
On June 28, 2017, Saunders signed a minor league contract with the Toronto Blue Jays. On August 31, Blue Jays' manager John Gibbons announced that Saunders would be called up on September 1.

Pittsburgh Pirates/Kansas City Royals/Baltimore Orioles/Chicago White Sox
Saunders signed a minor league contract with the Pittsburgh Pirates on February 21, 2018. After Pittsburgh acquired Corey Dickerson the following day, Saunders requested his release from the team. On February 23, he signed a minor league contract with the Kansas City Royals. The Royals released Saunders on March 24, and he signed a minor league contract with the Baltimore Orioles on April 2. On May 15, Saunders asked for and was granted his release by the Orioles. On May 21, 2018, Saunders signed a minor league deal with the Chicago White Sox. He was released on June 21, 2018.

Colorado Rockies
On December 30, 2018, Saunders signed a minor league deal with the Colorado Rockies. He was released on March 17, 2019.

International career
Saunders also represented Canada at the 2008 Olympics in Beijing, China. Serving as Canada's primary right-fielder, Saunders had eight hits in 28 at-bats out of the third spot in the line-up.  He scored five runs and had four RBI in seven games, while his two home runs led Canada to a 6th-place finish.

Saunders represented Canada at the 2013 World Baseball Classic (WBC) and was named as one of three outfielders on the All-WBC Team for his good offensive performance.

On January 9, 2019, he was selected Canada at the 2019 Pan American Games Qualifier.

On October 8, 2019, he was selected at the 2019 WBSC Premier12.

Post playing career
On October 25, 2019, Saunders announced that he would retire following the 2019 WBSC Premier12, and become a minor league coach in the Atlanta Braves organization in 2020. In March 2021, he was named as the manager of the Augusta GreenJackets, the Single-A affiliate of the Atlanta Braves.

References

External links

1986 births
Living people
American League All-Stars
Baseball people from British Columbia
Baseball players at the 2008 Summer Olympics
Canadian expatriate baseball players in the United States
Cardenales de Lara players
Canadian expatriate baseball players in Venezuela
Charlotte Knights players
Dunedin Blue Jays players
Everett AquaSox players
High Desert Mavericks players
Major League Baseball outfielders
Major League Baseball players from Canada
Olympic baseball players of Canada
Philadelphia Phillies players
Seattle Mariners players
Sportspeople from Victoria, British Columbia
Tacoma Rainiers players
Tallahassee Eagles baseball players
Toronto Blue Jays players
West Tennessee Diamond Jaxx players
Wisconsin Timber Rattlers players
World Baseball Classic players of Canada
2013 World Baseball Classic players
2019 WBSC Premier12 players